Anyte is a crater on Mercury. Its name was adopted by the International Astronomical Union (IAU) on August 4, 2017. Anyte is named for the Greek poet Anyte of Tegea.

Anyte lies within the larger crater Henri.  To the northwest is the crater Anguissola.

References

Impact craters on Mercury